IFC Center is an art house movie theater in Greenwich Village, Manhattan, New York City. Located at 323 Sixth Avenue (Avenue of the Americas) at West 3rd Street, it was formerly the Waverly Theater, an art house movie theater. IFC Center is owned by AMC Networks (known until July 1, 2011, as Rainbow Media), the entertainment company that owns the cable channels AMC, BBC America (49.99% stake and a joint venture with BBC Studios), IFC, We TV and Sundance TV and the offshoot film company IFC Films.

Current use
AMC Networks has positioned the theater as an extension of its cable channel IFC (Independent Film Channel) because IFC was to take over the building. IFC has converted the historic building, originally built as a church in the early 19th century, into a three-, and eventually five-theater facility.  Each theater is equipped to screen 35mm and high-definition digital video.  The complex also includes digital editing suites, a meeting area, and a restaurant called The Waverly, in recognition of the site's past. In addition to regularly scheduled films, the Center plays host to special screenings such as premieres, educational programs and television broadcasts. IFC's weekly series, formerly titled "At The Angelika" (filmed at the nearby Angelika Theater) relocated to IFC Center and thus the show has been retitled "At The IFC".

IFC Center opened on June 17, 2005 with the film Me and You and Everyone We Know, distributed by IFC Films.  The opening was not without controversy; for the first several weeks, patrons were welcomed to the theater by a picket line and a giant inflatable rat. The center had opened employing only non-union projectionists prompting a protest from the IATSE local 306.

It currently hosts the DOC NYC festival, and co-hosts the Human Rights Watch Film Festival.

In popular culture
The Waverly Theatre is referenced numerous times in the 1968 Broadway musical Hair, including the song "Frank Mills" sung by the character Crissy at the end of Act One.

The Waverly was also known as the original home of the midnight audience-participation screenings of the movie version of The Rocky Horror Picture Show, which ran there for many years, spawning similar showings in other cities.

Back to the Well, the making-of documentary for Clerks 2 has a scene filmed at the IFC Center where a test screening is held for Clerks 2 with Bob Weinstein in attendance.

See also

 Culture of New York City
 List of art cinemas in New York City
 List of theaters in New York

References

External links
 IFC Center
 Offbeat Movie Theaters in NYC at NY.com
Gimme Danger, Gimme Great Films: Both at the IFC - 2016 review and history  

Other art cinemas in Manhattan:
 Cinema Village  
 SunShine cinema (Land Mark Theaters)

Cinemas and movie theaters in Manhattan
AMC Networks
Greenwich Village